Håvard Skarpnes Wiik (born 10 March 1975) is a Norwegian jazz pianist and composer, known from a number of recordings with bands like Atomic, and performances with musicians like Petter Wettre, Ola Kvernberg and Stian Carstensen.

Career 

Wiik caused sensation at 17 years old in a concert at the Moldejazz, with bassist Steinar Raknes, as the "Wiikrak Duo". He attended the jazz program at Trondheim musikkonservatorium from 1994 to 96, where he and fellow students established the jazz band Element.

After moving to Oslo he has been a key player in many band projects, such as Atomic, "Free Fall", "Atomic Schooldays", a duo with Håkon Kornstad, a new project with Axel Dörner and Fredrik Ljungkvist. He has been an obvious choice as collaborator with giants in jazz, Kenny Wheeler, Lee Konitz, Joe Lovano representing the old school, and Ken Vandermark being a soul mate from the here and now., for example the band Motif. He also led the Håvard Wiik Trio with Mats Eilertsen (bass) and Per Oddvar Johansen (drums), to release Postures (Jazzland, 2003).

Wiik was recognized as "Artist in residence" at the Moldejazz (2004). At the Kongsberg Jazz Festival (2006), he was awarded the Vital prize, giving him the opportunity to perform as solo artist, and release the album Palinode (2007). He also started his own H.W. Trio, releasing Postures (2003), performing his own compositions. He transformed the trio to The Arcades Project (2007). In this version of the trio we find Håkon Mjåset Johansen on drums and Ole Morten Vågan on bass. They have also been involved within bands such as Urban Connection, Come Shine, Bugge Wesseltoft’s New Conception of Jazz.

Honors 
1999: Have no fear Award, by Oslo Jazzradio
2004: Artist in residence, at Moldejazz
2005: Artist of the year, at SoddJazz
2006: Spellemannprisen, in the class Jazz
2006: Kongsberg Jazz Award

Discography

Solo albums 

Postures (2002)
The Arcades project (2007), Havard Wiik Trio
Palinode (2007), solo
The Arcades Project (2007),

Collaborations 

With Atomic
Boom Boom (2002)
Nuclear assembly hall (2003)
The Bikini tapes (Jazzland Recordings, 2006)
Happy new ears!» (2006), awarded Spellemannprisen 2006Distil (2006, Atomic & School Days in Chicago)Retrograde (2007–08)

Duo with Håkon KornstadEight tunes we like (2003)The bad and the beautiful (2006)

With Free FallAmsterdam funk (2004)The point in a line (2006)Gray scale (2010)

With Motif
2008: Apo Calypso (Jazzland Recordings)
2010: Facienda (Jazzland Records)
2011: Art Transplant (Clean Feed Records), with Axel Dörner
2016: My Head Is Listening (Clean Feed Records)

Duo with François HouleAves (Songlines Recordings, 2013)

As sidemanPig virus (1996), with Petter Wettre QuartetSeptember song (1998), with Jens Arne MolværBjørn Johansen in memoriam (2003), with Petter WettreBackwards into the Backwood (2004), with Stian CarstensenPlaymachine (2004), with WibuteeHallmark moments, with Petter WettreÀ la Cour (2008), with Mads La CourApo Calypso (2008), with MotifA Fine Day In Berlin (Relay Recordings, 2013), with The Tim Daisy Trio featuring Clayton ThomasDie Anreicherung'' (Jazzwerkstatt, 2013), with Axel Dörner

References

External links 
 Havard Wiik Trio: The Arcades Project (2007) at All About Jazz

20th-century Norwegian pianists
21st-century Norwegian pianists
Norwegian jazz pianists
Norwegian jazz composers
Avant-garde jazz musicians
Norwegian University of Science and Technology alumni
Musicians from Kristiansund
Living people
1975 births
Household Records artists
Petter Wettre Quartet members
Atomic (band) members
Motif (band) members
Jazzland Recordings (1997) artists
Clean Feed Records artists